Hordelymus is a genus of European, north African, and southwest Asian plants in the grass family.

The only known species is Hordelymus europaeus, native to Europe (from Sweden + Ireland to Spain, Italy, and Russia) as well as North Africa (Algeria + Morocco) and southwestern Asia (Turkey + Caucasus). Wood-barley is a common name for H. europaeus.

formerly included 
see Taeniatherum 
 Hordelymus asper - Taeniatherum caput-medusae  
 Hordelymus caput-medusae - Taeniatherum caput-medusae

References

Pooideae
Monotypic Poaceae genera
Flora of Europe